St Catharine's Convent may refer to:

 St Catharine's Convent, Augsburg, Germany
 St Catharine's Convent, Edinburgh, Scotland

See also
 St. Catherine (disambiguation)